Allai is a comune (municipality) in the Province of Oristano in the Italian region Sardinia, located about  north of Cagliari and about  east of Oristano.

Allai borders the following municipalities: Busachi, Fordongianus, Ruinas, Samugheo, Siamanna, Siapiccia, Villaurbana.

References

Cities and towns in Sardinia
Articles which contain graphical timelines